is a Japanese surname.

Notable people 
, Japanese women's footballer
, Japanese classical pianist
, singer and actor, member of V6
Kent Nagano (born 1951), American orchestral conductor
, Japanese fisherman 
, Japanese manga artist
, Japanese actress
, Imperial Japanese Navy admiral
, one of the two manga artists under the pen name 
, Japanese Idol, member of Idoling
, Japanese photographer
, Japanese footballer
, Japanese volleyball player
Yudai Nagano (disambiguation), multiple people
Yukimi Nagano (born 1982), Swedish singer

Surnames
Japanese-language surnames